The 2004 United States presidential election in Iowa took place on November 2, 2004, as part of the 2004 United States presidential election in which all 50 states plus the District of Columbia participated. Voters chose seven electors to represent them in the Electoral College via a popular vote pitting incumbent Republican President George W. Bush and his running mate, Vice President Dick Cheney, against Democratic challenger and Senator from Massachusetts John F. Kerry and his running mate, Senator from North Carolina John Edwards. Six third parties were also on the ballot.

Iowa was won by President George W. Bush by a 0.67% margin of victory, or 10,059 votes, despite losing the state to Al Gore four years earlier. Prior to the election, most news organizations considered this a swing state. The Democrats had won Iowa in the previous four presidential elections, though only narrowly in 2000. Gore had won the state by only 0.32 percentage points, or 4,144 votes, a much weaker margin compared to the prior three elections. In 1988, Democrat Michael Dukakis won the state by 10.21% even in an otherwise Republican landslide year, and Bill Clinton carried the state by 6.02% in 1992 and 10.34% in 1996. Iowa was one of just two states, along with New Mexico, to vote for Gore in 2000 but flip to Bush in 2004, although it was won both times by narrow margins.  Iowa was 1 of 2 states to be won by George W. Bush in either of his presidential runs to have never been carried by George H. W. Bush.  The other state being West Virginia. 

Bush became the first Republican to win Iowa since Ronald Reagan had done so in 1984. As of the 2020 presidential election, this is the last time a Republican won Iowa by only a plurality. Until 2020, this was the last time Iowa did not vote for the same candidate as neighboring Wisconsin. This election marked a new streak of Iowa voting for the winning ticket in every election along with Florida and Ohio until 2020 when all three voted for the losing candidate. With Iowa, Florida, and Ohio's winning streaks no longer being intact, Wisconsin, Michigan, and Pennsylvania are now all tied for the longest streaks of siding with the winner, all three of which most recently failing to do so when they backed Kerry during his losing presidential bid in 2004. 

Bush is also the only US president to win the White House without Iowa to then carry it upon winning re-election.  This is the opposite to Woodrow Wilson and FDR as they are the only two presidents to have carried the Hawkeye State upon winning office but lose it upon re-election.

Caucuses
 2004 Iowa Democratic presidential caucuses

Campaign

Predictions
There were 12 news organizations who made state-by-state predictions of the election. Here are their last predictions before election day.

Polling
Polls showed the state was a pure tossup with neither candidate reaching a consistent lead. The last three polls averaged both candidates at 48%, with the last-second deciders the key to victory. The final RealClearPolitics average gave Bush leading with a margin of 0.3%, with 47.4% to Kerry at 47.1% and Nader at 1.0%.

Fundraising
Bush raised $671,335. Kerry raised $449,980.

Advertising and visits
The Kerry campaign visited the state 11 times to Bush's 10 times. Both campaigns spent between $400,000 to $600,000 each week in television advertising.

Analysis
Kerry's strength in the state lay in the highly-populated counties of Polk (Des Moines), Linn (Cedar Rapids), Scott (Davenport), Johnson (Iowa City), and Black Hawk (Waterloo). Johnson County, home to the University of Iowa, gave Kerry 64.01% of its vote, Kerry's best performance in the state. However, Kerry also did well in a series of rural and small-town counties in northeastern Iowa and along the Mississippi River, many of which had been traditionally Democratic since at least the 1980's. He won eight of the ten counties along the Mississippi River, including Dubuque County, which had given Gore his margin in the state in 2000. The 1st and 2nd congressional districts were both carried by Kerry, despite being represented by Republicans in Congress. Dubuque is located within the 1st district while the 2nd district contains Cedar Rapids, Iowa City, and Muscatine.

However, Bush performed respectably even in areas of Democratic strength; in only two counties did he obtain less than 40% of the vote. Additionally, he was able to offset Kerry's strength in the population centers and in the northeast and Mississippi River counties with landslide margins in a series of rural counties in the west of the state, as well as by dominating the state's south. Bush's best performance in the state was in Sioux County, where he won with 85.87% of the vote. His raw vote margin in Sioux County of 11,970 votes alone was greater than his raw vote margin over Kerry statewide. Bush won three congressional districts in the state: the 3rd district, home to the Democratic city of Des Moines and its Republican suburbs, gave Bush a razor thin 50-50 margin, despite re-electing Democrat Leonard Boswell to Congress. The 4th district also gave Bush a narrow margin, giving him 51% of the vote. The now obsolete 5th district in the western part of the state was home to the Hawkeye State's most Republican areas, having elected Steve King to Congress in 2002; it gave Bush a landslide 21-point margin.

In terms of counties carried, both candidates flipped counties. Bush flipped four that voted for Gore in 2000, while Kerry flipped five that voted for Bush in 2000. This election coincided with the 2004 United States Senate election in Iowa, where Republican Chuck Grassley was effortlessly re-elected with 70.83% of the vote.

Iowa would return to the Democratic column in the next two elections, voting for Barack Obama by 9.54% in 2008 and 5.81% in 2012. However, in 2016, it returned to the Republican column when Donald Trump would win the state by 9.41%, the largest margin of victory for a Republican presidential nominee in the state since Ronald Reagan's in 1980.

Results

By county

Counties that flipped from Democratic to Republican

 Cedar (largest city: Tipton)
 Greene (largest city: Jefferson)
 Louisa (largest city: Wapello)
 Winnebago (largest city: Forest City)

Counties that flipped from Republican to Democratic

 Fayette (largest city: Oelwein)
 Jasper (largest city: Newton)
 Jefferson (largest city: Fairfield)
 Poweshiek (largest city: Grinnell)
 Winneshiek (largest city: Decorah)

By congressional district
Bush won 3 of 5 congressional districts, including one held by a Democrat. Kerry won two held by Republicans.

Electors

Iowa voters cast their ballots for electors: representatives to the Electoral College. Iowa has 7 electors because it has 5 congressional districts and 2 senators. All candidates who appear on the ballot or qualify to receive write-in votes must submit a list of 7 electors, who pledge to vote for their candidate and their running mate. Whoever wins the majority of votes in the state is awarded all 7 electoral votes. Their chosen electors then vote for president and vice president. Although electors are pledged to their candidate and running mate, they are not obligated to vote for them. An elector who votes for someone other than his or her candidate is known as a faithless elector.

The electors of each state and the District of Columbia met on December 13, 2004, to cast their votes for president and vice president. The Electoral College itself never meets as one body. Instead the electors from each state and the District of Columbia meet in their respective capitols.

The following were the members of the Electoral College from Iowa. All were pledged to and voted for Bush and Cheney.
 Julie Hosch
 Velma Huebner
 Don Racheter
 Marilyn Bose
 Don Kass
 Dorothy Schlitter
 Wanda Sears

See also
 United States presidential elections in Iowa

References

 
 

Iowa
2004
Presidential